Aruküla is a village in Järva Parish, Järva County in northern-central Estonia.

Aruküla Manor

Aruküla ;anor evolved into an independent estate in the 17th century. The manor house seen today was built in 1782–1789, but suffered damage in a fire around 1800 and was subsequently rebuilt in a typical St. Petersburg-style Neoclassicism, with details such as decorative stucco laurel wreaths and a wrought-iron fence surrounding the manor park.

Russian general Karl Wilhelm von Toll, mentioned by Tolstoy in his epic "War and Peace", lived on Aruküla manor and is buried in a chapel on the grounds.

References

External links
Aruküla manor at Estonian Manors Portal

Villages in Järva County
Manor houses in Estonia
Kreis Jerwen